The 2005/06 NTFL season was the 85th season of the Northern Territory Football League (NTFL).

Darwin won their 23rd premiership title while defeating St Marys in the grand final by 42 points.

Grand Final

References

Northern Territory Football League seasons
NTFL